Louis Williquet (born 1890, date of death unknown) was a Belgian weightlifter who competed in the 1920 Summer Olympics. In 1920 he won the silver medal in the lightweight class.

References

External links
Profile

1890 births
Year of death missing
Belgian male weightlifters
Olympic weightlifters of Belgium
Weightlifters at the 1920 Summer Olympics
Olympic silver medalists for Belgium
Olympic medalists in weightlifting
Medalists at the 1920 Summer Olympics
20th-century Belgian people